Benjamin Staern, born 6 December 1978 in Gothenburg, Swedish composer. Son of Gunnar Staern.

Education 
Staern studied in his childhood cello, piano and percussion at the local music school in Malmö. During his studies in musicology at Lund University and before he felt that composition proved to be an interesting path to pursue. The following year he was accepted at the composition department at Musikhögskolan in Malmö, where he studied during the years 1998 to 2005 with professors Rolf Martinsson, Hans Gefors, Kent Olofsson (electronic music), Björn-Tryggve Johansson (instrumentation and counterpoint), Per Mårtensson and Lars Sandberg. During his diploma studies his main professor was Luca Francesconi. He was awarded a Diploma of Fine Arts and Music at the latter mentioned academy.

Career
Staern's music has been performed at festivals for new music, such as Ung Nordisk Musik, Stockholm New Music and Sirenfestivalen in Gothenburg. In August 2006, his work The Threat of War was be performed twice by the Royal Stockholm Philharmonic Orchestra in Stockholm Concert Hall, conducted by Michael Christie

Staern also received grants from the Swedish Royal Musical Academy, Helge Ax: son Johnson, Annik och Lars Leander, Rosenborg/Gehrmans composition study scholarship and STIM.

New European Ensemble residency

Following an invitation from New European Ensemble's artistic director, Christian Karlsen, Benjamin Staern became the first composer-in-residence of The Netherlands-based group. He has up till now written two large works for them Tranströmersånger and the chamber symphony Bells and Waves. The residency is said to lead to 3-4 works. Bells and Waves was awarded - Most Significant Chamber Work of the Year - by the Swedish Music Publisher's Association in November 2011.

Selection of works 
 The Threat of War (1999–2000, rev. 01) for symphony orchestra
 Muramaris (2000) for fifteen solo string instruments
 Colour wandering (2002) for ten brass musicians
 Yellow skies (2003) for alto flute
 Endast luft och brus (2004–05) for tuba and live electronics
 Sacrificio (2004–05) for tuba, live electronics and symphony orchestra
 Confrontation (2006) for trumpet solo and brass quintet
 Jubilate (2008) for symphony orchestra
 Tranströmersånger (Tranströmer Settings) (2009/10) for alto and ensemble
 Bells and Waves (2010) chamber symphony for large ensemble
 Worried Souls (2011) concerto for clarinet and symphony orchestra
 Godai (2012–13) concerto for orchestra
 Sånger av bländvit kärlek (Songs of Blindingly White Love) (poems from misc. collections by Karin Boye) (2013) for alto and orchestra.
 Saiyah (2013–14) for two soloists, large ensemble, electronics and stage art.

External links 
 Official webpage

Footnotes 

1978 births
Contemporary classical music in Sweden
Living people
Swedish classical composers
Swedish male classical composers
Musikförläggarnas pris winners